Sara Wesslin (born 7 November 1991) is a Skolt Saami journalist and news anchor from Finland and a strong advocate of the Skolt Sami language, her grandmother Olga's mother tongue. She took on the Finnish Ministry of Education and Culture to secure funding from Finland for the Nordic Resource Centre for the Sami languages.

In October 2019, she was one of the "inspiring and influential women" featured in the BBC's 100 Women. Wesslin has used her media resources and access to popular culture to help revive the Skolt Sámi language. She has also focused on teaching it to women who she believes play a huge role in keeping the language in their family. In June 2020, she was shortlisted for the One Young World Journalist of the Year Award.

Background
Wesslin, born in Finland in the early 1990s, is a journalist with the Finnish broadcasting authority Yle where she started to work in the newsroom in 2013. Based in Inari in the far north of Finland, she is one of just two journalists who currently broadcast on radio and television in the Skolt Sami language, the other being Erkki Gauriloff. She now writes stories and presents the news in Skolt Sami, Northern Sami, and Finnish. Wesslin has assisted Tiina Sanila-Aikio, president of the Finnish Sámi Parliament, who has also contributed to the revival of the Skolt Sami language and culture.

In 2006, few people under 30 could speak Skolt Sámi. In the intervening years Wesslin has promoted the use of the language in government, media, and in Finnish professional life. When she was featured in the BBC's 100 Women, Wesslin was surprised that she had been included, commenting: "When you think about the world nowadays, when endangered languages are dying all the time and disappearing, it’s kind of a privilege that I can do my work in Skolt Sámi which is spoken by around 300 people." She explained that television news in Skolt Sami had been welcomed by the audience, especially those who do not use the Internet, as they could now follow it in their mother tongue.

References

External links
 
 
 
 BBC video

Living people
1991 births
Skolts
Finnish Sámi people
Finnish journalists
Finnish broadcasters
Finnish women journalists
Finnish Sámi-language writers
Finnish-language writers
BBC 100 Women
21st-century Finnish women writers
21st-century journalists